The 1985–86 Polska Liga Hokejowa season was the 51st season of the Polska Liga Hokejowa, the top level of ice hockey in Poland. 10 teams participated in the league, and Polonia Bytom won the championship.

Final round

Qualification round

Playoffs

Quarterfinals 
 Polonia Bytom - GKS Tychy 2:0 (10:1, 6:1)
 Naprzód Janów - Stoczniowiec Gdansk 2:0 (8:2, 5:3)
 Podhale Nowy Targ - ŁKS Łódź 2:1 (6:4, 1:4, 5:0)
 Zagłębie Sosnowiec - GKS Katowice 2:0 (4:3, 5:2)

Semifinals 
 Polonia Bytom - Naprzód Janów 2:0 (3:1, 6:2)
 Podhale Nowy Targ - Zagłębie Sosnowiec 2:1 (5:3, 2:3, 4:2)

Final 
 Polonia Bytom - Podhale Nowy Targ 2:1 (1:0, 3:4, 4:2)

Relegation 
 KS Cracovia - KTH Krynica

External links
 Season on hockeyarchives.info

Polska
Polska Hokej Liga seasons
Liga